El Tecolote is a free bilingual, biweekly newspaper published by the nonprofit Acción Latina, and based in San Francisco that covers the Mission District and the surrounding area for the Latino community. It is the longest running bilingual newspaper that is printed in both English and Spanish in California. The newspaper can also be read online daily.

History
El Tecolote can trace its roots to student activism from 1970. The newspaper began as a project in a La Raza Studies class at San Francisco State University that was created by Juan Gonzales, who wanted to try to channel more Latinos into journalism. The final project of this class was to create a bilingual newspaper in English and Spanish. The founder and first editor was Juan Gonzales. It was first printed and came out on August 24, 1970. It was named El Tecolote, Spanish for "The Owl." Its signature logo is the wise owl. In 1971 the newspaper moved out of the university and into the Mission District, becoming now part of the community. The paper is published and managed by Accion Latina, a nonprofit organization that promotes social activities that help empower the Latino community in San Francisco.

Latino community newspaper
The newspaper is written primarily for the Latino community in the Mission District, capturing the everyday life of Latinos, and focusing on local and community affairs that affect them, and covering stories that are often ignored by the mainstream media. The paper writes original news stories, telling news from the Latino point of view. Promoting Latino civil rights, helping to create community identity, and writing stories about the culture of the Latino community are some of the goals of the paper. The paper is largely staffed by volunteers, and many college students and young journalists have written for the paper.

Online, social media, and podcasts
The paper has met the challenges of technological change in media by adapting to the digital age by adding a website and now also having online publication. The stories that come out in its printed newspaper are picked from the stories that have come from its online publication. And the paper now has a Facebook page, a Twitter account, and is on Instagram.

On March 1, 2021, the publication launched its podcast, Radio Teco. The digital arm of the long-standing bilingual El Tecolote newspaper, the podcast dives into the rich and nuanced cultural history of Latinx communities across the San Francisco Bay Area and beyond. Episodes are released every Monday, with occasional bonus episodes released throughout the week. The podcast follows the launch of the bilingual Making of a Candidate/El Camindo del CandidatX podcast mini-series, which debuted on October 30, 2020.

Coverage and distribution
The paper covers the Mission District and the surrounding areas of Excelsior, Bernal Heights, and the East Bay. The paper has thousands of people reading it online, and the paper also distributes 10,000 free copies every two weeks throughout the Mission District and the East Bay by way of restaurants, libraries, clinics and social service centers.

See also

 New America Media

References

External links
 El Tecolote Online
 El Tecolote Facebook
  El Tecolote Twitter
 El Tecolote Instagram
 Accion Latina (publisher of El Tecolote)

Newspapers published in the San Francisco Bay Area
Spanish-language newspapers published in California
Publications established in 1970
Companies based in San Francisco
1970 establishments in California